Pyropia is a genus of red algae [seaweed] in the family Bangiaceae. It is found around the world in intertidal zones and shallow water. The genus has folding frond-like blades which are either red, brown or green. Some Pyropia species are used to create nori, and are thus important subjects for aquaculture.

Taxonomy
Pyropia was originally erected by Jacob Georg Agardh, a botanist and professor at Lund University. Before this, and sometimes after, many species of Pyropia were placed in Porphyra, a different genus of red alga. New species of Pyropia are still being discovered, for example in 2013 research done on New Zealand plants was able to move Pyropia plicata from Porphyra.

Description
Pyropia species are red algae with a discoid holdfast and short stipe. They have folded blades, which are membranous and monostromatic, coming in red, brown, and dark green colorations. These folded blades may also look like fronds until unfolded. These blades reach up to one meter in length in some species, but are generally around 20 centimeters in diameter.

Distribution
Pyropia grows in intertidal zones and down to 10 meters in some bodies of water based on clarity and substrate. It grows in large swaths, attaching itself to stones and shells, covering most of the bottom. Pyropia can be found globally in warm-temperate and extratropical [cool] waters.

Ecology
Pyropia species, which reside in the upper intertidal zone, endure many stresses, including intense direct light, temperature fluctuation, osmotic stress, salinity fluctuation, and desiccation. They are especially able to handle heat stress; some Pyropia species will halt metabolic systems that are not essential to homeostasis, such as photosynthesis. Other species will use increased lipid production to fight desiccation. The ability of Pyropia species to adapt to deal with these stresses makes them heavily studied organisms.

One of the threats to Pyropia is fungal infections by Alternaria sp. ZL-1, which has been observed in farming environments on Pyropia yezoensis . The fungus kills Pyropia cells and leaves brown rust-like spots on the outside of the blades.

Use
Within the genus Pyropia multiple species are used for nori (edible seaweed), Pyropia yezoensis and P. haitanensis being most popular. It is a two-billion-dollar industry with most major growers located in China, Korea, and Japan.

Nori contains substantial amounts of Vitamin B12 according to a 2014 paper. However, the Academy of Nutrition and Dietetics considers this source unreliable for vegans.

Species
 P. abbottiae (V.Krishnamurthy) S.C.Lindstrom
 P. acanthophora var. robusta M.G.Kavale, M.A.Kazi & N.Sreenadhan
 P. acanthophora (E.C.Oliveira & Coll) M.C.Oliveira, D.Milstein & E.C.Oliveira
 P. aeodis (N.J.Griffin, J.J.Bolton & R.J.Anderson) J.E.Sutherland
 P. bajacaliforniensis Aguilar Rosas & Hughey
 P. brumalis (Mumford) S.C.Lindstrom
 P. cinnamomea (W.A.Nelson) W.A.Nelson
 P. collinsii Neefus, T.Bray & A.C.Mathieson
 P. columbiensis S.C.Lindstrom
 P. columbina (Montagne) W.A.Nelson
 P. conwayae (S.C.Lindstrom & K.M.Cole) S.C.Lindstrom
 P. crassa (Ueda) N.Kikuchi & M.Miyata
 P. dentata (Kjellman) N.Kikuchi & M.Miyata
 P. denticulata (Levring) J.A.Philips & J.E.Sutherland
 P. drachii (Feldmann) J.Brodie
 P. elongata (Kylin) Neefus & J.Brodie
 P. endiviifolia (A.Gepp & E.Gepp) H.G.Choi & M.S.Hwang
 P. fallax (S.C.Lindstrom & K.M.Cole) S.C.Lindstrom
 P. francisii W.A.Nelson & R.D'Archino
 P. fucicola (V.Krishnamurthy) S.C.Lindstrom
 P. gardneri (G.M.Smith & Hollenberg) S.C.Lindstrom
 P. haitanensis (T.J.Chang & B.F.Zheng) N.Kikuchi & M.Miyata
 P. hiberna (S.C.Lindstrom & K.M.Cole) S.C.Lindstrom
 P. hollenbergii (E.Y.Dawson) J.E.Sutherland, L.E.Aguilar Rosas & R.Aguilar Rosas
 P. ishigecola (A.Miura) N.Kikuchi & M.Miyata
 P. kanakaensis (Mumford) S.C.Lindstrom
 P. katadae (A.Miura) M.S.Hwang, H.G.Choi, N.Kikuch & M.Miyata
 P. kinositae (Yamada & Tak. Tanaka) N.Kikuchi, M.Miyata, M.S.Hwang & H.G.Choi
 P. koreana (M.S.Hwang & I.K.Lee) M.S.Hwang, H.G.Choi Y.S.Oh & I.K.Lee
 P. kuniedae (Kurogi) M.S.Hwang & H.G.Choi
 P. kurogii (S.C.Lindstrom) S.C.Lindstrom
 P. lacerata (A.Miura) N.Kikuchi & M.Miyata
 P. lanceolata (Setchell & Hus) S.C.Lindstrom
 P. leucosticta (Thuret) Neefus & J.Brodie
 P. montereyensis S.C.Lindstrom & Hughey
 P. moriensis (Ohmi) N.Kikuchi & M.Miyata
 P. nereocystis (C.L.Anderson) S.C.Lindstrom
 P. nitida L.K.Harden, K.M.Morales & Hughey
 P. njordii Mols-Mortensen, J.Brodie & Neefus
 P. novae-angliae T.Bray, Neefus & A.C.Mathieson
 P. onoi (Ueda) N.Kikuchi & M.Miyata
 P. orbicularis M.E.Ramírez, L.Contreras Porcia & M.-L.Guillemin
 P. parva A.Vergés & N.Sánchez
 P. peggicovensis H.Kucera & G.W.Saunders
 P. pendula (E.Y.Daywson) J.E.Sutherland, L.E.Aguilar-Rosas & R.Aguilar-Rosas
 P. perforata (J.Agardh) S.C.Lindstrom
 P. plicata W.A.Nelson
 P. protolanceolata S.C.Lindstrom & J.R.Hughey
 P. pseudolanceolata (V.Krishnamurthy) S.C.Lindstrom
 P. pseudolinearis (Ueda) N.Kikuchi, M.Miyata, M.S.Hwang & H.G.Choi
 P. pulchella (Ackland, J.A.West, J.L.Scott & Zuccarello) T.J.Farr & J.E.Sutherland
 P. pulchra (Hollenberg) S.C.Lindstrom & Hughey
 P. rakiura (W.A.Nelson) W.A.Nelson
 P. raulaguilarii Mateo-Cid, Mendoza-González & Sentíes
 P. saldanhae (Stegenga, J.J.Bolton & R.J.Anderson) J.E.Sutherland
 P. seriata (Kjellman) N.Kikuchi & M.Miyata
 P. spathulata T.Bray, Neefus & A.C.Mathieson
 P. spiralis var. amplifolia (E.C.Oliveira & Coll) Freshwater & Kapraun
 P. spiralis (E.C.Oliveira & Coll) M.C.Oliveira, D.Milstein & E.C.Oliveira
 P. stamfordensis C.Neefus, T.Bray & A.C.Mathieson
 P. suborbiculata (Kjellman) J.E.Sutherland, H.G.Choi, M.S. Hwang & W.A.Nelson
 P. tanegashimensis (Shinmura) N.Kikuchi & E. Fujiyoshi
 P. tenera (Kjellman) N.Kikuchi, M.Miyata, M.S.Hwang & H.G.Choi
 P. tenera var. tamatsuensis (A.Miura) N.Kikuchi, Niwa & Nakada
 P. tenuipedalis (A.Miura) N.Kikuchi & M.Miyata
 P. thulaea (Munda & P.M.Pedersen) Neefus
 P. thuretii (Setchell & E.Y.Dawson) J.E.Sutherland, L.E.Aguilar Rosas & R. Aguilar Rosas
 P. torta (V.Krishnamurthy) S.C.Lindstrom
 P. unabbottiae S.C.Lindstrom
 P. vietnamensis (Tak.Tanaka & Pham-Hoàng Ho) J.E.Sutherland & Monotilla
 P. virididentata (W.A.Nelson) W.A.Nelson
 P. yezoensis f. narawaensis N.Kikuchi, Niwa & Nakada
 P. yezoensis (Ueda) M.S.Hwang & H.G.Choi

Gallery

References

External links
 
 

Bangiophyceae
Red algae genera
Edible algae
Seaweeds
Edible seaweeds